Ucayali may refer to:

 Ucayali River, a river in Peru
 Ucayali Region, one of the 25 regions of Peru
 Ucayali Province, a province in Loreto region in Peru
 Ucayali Peneplain, an erosion surface in the Amazon basin

See also 

 Ucayali moist forests
 Scolomys ucayalensis, also called Ucayali spiny mouse